Daniel McGowan is a British Muay Thai fighter.

Biography and career
 
McGowan started Muay Thai training at 11 years old after trying Tae Kwon Do and Kickboxing. He was one of the youngest non thai to fight at the Rajadamnern Stadium at 15 years old promoted by Petchyindee, he spends time at their academy regularly since that fight.

On January 10, 2016 at SNKA WINNERS 2016 McGowan faced Shiro for the ISKA World Muay Thai Bantamweight title. He lost the fight by a unanimous decision.

On August 26, 2017 McGowan faced Ryan Sheehan for the vacant ICO World 55kg title. After a very back and forth fight McGowan was declared the winner by unanimous decision.

McGowan became a force to be reckoned with when he knocked out multiple weights stadium champion Rungnarai Kiatmuu9 at YOKKAO in October 2017. This win opened him for big fights in Thailand where two months later he beat Thanadej Thor.Pran49 but injured his hand in the process.

Mcgowan made his comeback in September 2018, he knocked out Saengmorakot Sakphinyo with an elbow on the televised portion of an event at Rajadamnern Stadium. Two months later he beat Ratanaphon Nor.Anuwatgym but injured his hand again and had multiple surgeries which took him out of competition for multiple years.

Mcgowan made his return to competition after 3 years of hiatus on March 26, 2022 at Combat Fight Series 7. He faced Mario Alvarez for the ISKA Muay Thai Intercontinental 67kg title. He lost the fight by knockout in the third round.

Titles and accomplishments

Amateur
 47Kg WRSA World Champion 
 49Kg GBMA World Champion
 51Kg WRSA World Champion

Professional
Muay Thai Grand Prix
 2016 MTGP Bantamweight Champion

International Combat Organisation
 2017 ICO World -55 kg Champion

Muay Thai record

|-  style="background:#;"
| 2023-04-23 || ||align=left| Daren Rolland || Hitman Fight League || London, England ||  ||  || 
|-
! style=background:white colspan=9 |
|-  style="background:#cfc;"
| 2022-11-20|| Win ||align=left| Sandro Martin|| Combat Fight Series || London, England || Decision (Unanimous) || 3 || 3:00
|-  style="background:#fbb;"
| 2022-03-26||Loss||align=left| Mario Alvarez|| Combat Fight Series 7 || London, England || KO (Knee to the body) || 3 || 2:15
|-
! style=background:white colspan=9 |
|-  style="background:#CCFFCC;"
| 2018-11-30|| Win ||align=left| Ratanaphon Nor.Anuwatgym || True4U ||  Thailand || Decision || 5 || 3:00
|-  style="background:#CCFFCC;"
| 2018-09-25|| Win ||align=left| Saengmorakot Sakphinyo || Rajadamnern Stadium || Bangkok, Thailand || KO (Right elbow) || 3 ||
|-  style="background:#CCFFCC;"
| 2017-12-08|| Win ||align=left| Thanadet Thor.Pran49 || True4U Rangsit Stadium || Rangsit, Thailand || Decision  || 5 ||3:00
|-  style="background:#CCFFCC;"
| 2017-10-15|| Win ||align=left| Rungnarai Kiatmuu9 || YOKKAO 28 || Bolton, England || KO (Left Hook) || 3 || 2:05
|-  style="background:#CCFFCC;"
| 2017-08-26 || Win||align=left| Ryan Sheehan || Muay Thaï World Class Action || Birmingham, England || Decision (Unanimous) || 5 || 3:00  
|-
! style=background:white colspan=9 |
|-  style="background:#FFBBBB;"
| 2016-08-07 || Loss ||align=left| Ja Kiatphontip||  || United Kingdom || Decision || 5 || 3:00  
|-
! style=background:white colspan=9 |
|-  style="background:#CCFFCC;"
| 2016-06-11 || Win||align=left| Renaud Gurgui-Halsdorff || Muay Thai Grand Prix 5 || London, England || TKO (Referee Stoppage)|| 2 || 1:45  
|-
! style=background:white colspan=9 |
|-  style="background:#CCFFCC;"
| 2016-03-26 || Win||align=left| Victor Saravia || Muay Thai Grand Prix 3 || London, England || TKO (Doctor Stoppage/Elbow) || 2 ||
|-  style="background:#FFBBBB;"
| 2016-01-10 || Loss ||align=left| Shiro || SNKA WINNERS 2016|| Tokyo, Japan || Decision (Unanimous)|| 5 || 3:00 
|-
! style=background:white colspan=9 |
|-  style="background:#CCFFCC;"
| 2015-11-22 || Win||align=left| Adrian Lopez || Muay Thai Grand Prix 2 || United Kingdom || Decision || 5 || 3:00
|-  style="background:#FFBBBB;"
| 2015-07-31 || Loss||align=left| Romie Adanza || Lion Fight 23 || United States || TKO (Doctor Stoppage/Elbow)|| 3 ||2:10
|-  style="background:#CCFFCC;"
| 2015-06-20 || Win||align=left| Burak Illgin || Muay Thai Grand Prix 1 || United Kingdom || Disqualification || 2 || 3:00
|-  style="background:#FFBBBB;"
| 2015-01-25|| Loss||align=left|  Kongfak Sor. Chairoth || Rangsit Stadium || Rangsit, Thailand || KO (Straight right) || 2 ||
|-  style="background:#CCFFCC;"
| 2014-12-17|| Win ||align=left| Daodang Boribhatburirum || Rajadamnern Stadium || Bangkok, Thailand || Decision || 5 || 3:00
|-  style="background:#CCFFCC;"
| 2014-10-11 || Win||align=left| Nestor Rodriguez  || YOKKAO 11|| Bolton, England || Decision || 5 || 3:00
|-  style="background:#CCFFCC;"
| 2014-08-30 || Win||align=left| Rui Botelho  || Fighting Machines|| United Kingdom || Decision || 5 || 3:00
|-  style="background:#CCFFCC;"
| 2014-07-05 || Win||align=left| Paulo Da Silva || Smash Muay Thai 9 || Watford, England || Decision || 5 || 3:00
|-  style="background:#CCFFCC;"
| 2014-05-03 || Win||align=left| Kieran McAskill || Power of Scotland || Scotland || Decision || 5 || 3:00
|-  style="background:#CCFFCC;"
| 2014-03-08 || Win||align=left| Jordan Coe || YOKKAO 8|| Bolton, England || Decision || 5 || 3:00
|-  style="background:#CCFFCC;"
| 2013-12-05 ||Win ||align=left| Wansongkram Phanukut || Muay Thai Warriors|| Bangkok, Thailand || Decision || 5 || 3:00
|-  style="background:#CCFFCC;"
| 2013-08-17 || Win||align=left| Jason Dick || HGH || United Kingdom || KO (Left hook to the body) || 4 ||
|-  style="background:#CCFFCC;"
| 2013 ||Win ||align=left| Reece Thomson || || United Kingdom || ||  ||
|-  style="background:#CCFFCC;"
| 2013-04-06 || Win||align=left| Masimok Sitkrupak  || Lumpinee Stadium || Bangkok, Thailand || Decision || 5 || 3:00
|-  style="background:#CCFFCC;"
| 2013-02-23 || Win||align=left| Fahthai Mor Watanachai  || Lumpinee Stadium || Bangkok, Thailand || Decision || 5 || 3:00
|-  style="background:#CCFFCC;"
| 2012-11-02 || Win ||align=left| Phalangpetch || Lumpinee Stadium|| Bangkok, Thailand || Decision  || 5 || 3:00
|-  style="background:#CCFFCC;"
| 2012-08-12 || Win ||align=left| Thai Rompo Gym || Rajadamnern Stadium|| Bangkok, Thailand || KO (Sweep to head kick) || 4 ||
|-  style="background:#FFBBBB;"
| 2012-07-20 || Loss||align=left| Insee Sirinthip || Muay Thai Warriors|| Thailand || Decision || 5 || 3:00
|-  style="background:#CCFFCC;"
| 2012-02-11 || Win||align=left|  ||  || Thailand || Decision || 5 || 3:00
|-  style="background:#CCFFCC;"
| 2011-04|| Win||align=left|  || Rajadamnern Stadium || Bangkok, Thailand || Decision || 5 || 3:00  
|-
| colspan=9 | Legend:

References

1996 births
Living people
English Muay Thai practitioners
Sportspeople from Luton